Richard S. Hodes (April 24, 1924 – January 18, 2002) was an American politician. He served as a Democratic member for the 68th district of the Florida House of Representatives.

Hodes was born in New York, and moved to Florida in 1935. He attended Tulane University, where he earned a Bachelor of Science degree in 1944. Hodes practised as a physician, and was also a television presenter. In 1967 

Hodes was elected as a member for the newly-established 68th district of the Florida House of Representatives, serving until 1982. He was honored with the Florida Jaycees Good Government Award in 1970, and was also nominated as the St. Petersburg Times's Most Valuable Member of the House at least four times. He was the chairman of the Florida House of Representatives Health and Rehabilitation Services Committee.

Hodes died in January 2002, at the age of 77.

References 

1924 births
2002 deaths
Democratic Party members of the Florida House of Representatives
20th-century American politicians
American physicians
20th-century American physicians
American television hosts
Tulane University alumni